Tumbulawa is a village in Una-Una island, Central Sulawesi, Indonesia. Its population is 1226.

Climate
Tumbulawa has a tropical rainforest climate (Af) with heavy to very heavy rainfall year-round.

References

Populated places in Central Sulawesi